Palaquium ellipticum is a tree in the family Sapotaceae. This is a common canopy tree in low and medium elevation evergreen forests up to 1500 m. This species is endemic to the Western Ghats.

Description 
This is a tall, buttressed trees, and can grow up to  height. Bark is smooth, lenticellate, irregularly flaky when mature and the blaze is reddish brown. Branches are with architecture of "Aubreville's model"; The young branchlets are terete, puberulent, later it turns glabrous. It has a white and profuse latex. The branchlets are usually 2-3 mm thick, and sympodial. Leaves are alternate, simple, petioles 20-25 mm long, blade 7.5-10 x 3.7-5 cm. Leaf shape could be ovate or obovate, tip is obtuse, blunt, base is narrow, margin entire, and there will be 10-12 pairs of lateral nerves. Leaves are glabrous too. Flowers are bisexual, in axillary fascicles, 10-12 x 10-12 mm length, and the color is white. Fruit is a berry, 3-3.7 x 1-1.6 cm length, ellipsoid shape and, green. One seed per fruit.

References 

ellipticum
Flora of the Western Ghats
Plants described in 1851
Taxa named by Nicol Alexander Dalzell